This article is about the particular significance of the year 1836 to Wales and its people.

Incumbents
Lord Lieutenant of Anglesey – Henry Paget, 1st Marquess of Anglesey 
Lord Lieutenant of Brecknockshire – Penry Williams
Lord Lieutenant of Caernarvonshire – Peter Drummond-Burrell, 22nd Baron Willoughby de Eresby 
Lord Lieutenant of Cardiganshire – William Edward Powell
Lord Lieutenant of Carmarthenshire – George Rice, 3rd Baron Dynevor 
Lord Lieutenant of Denbighshire – Sir Watkin Williams-Wynn, 5th Baronet    
Lord Lieutenant of Flintshire – Robert Grosvenor, 1st Marquess of Westminster 
Lord Lieutenant of Glamorgan – John Crichton-Stuart, 2nd Marquess of Bute 
Lord Lieutenant of Merionethshire – Sir Watkin Williams-Wynn, 5th Baronet
Lord Lieutenant of Monmouthshire – Capel Hanbury Leigh
Lord Lieutenant of Montgomeryshire – Edward Herbert, 2nd Earl of Powis
Lord Lieutenant of Pembrokeshire – Sir John Owen, 1st Baronet
Lord Lieutenant of Radnorshire – George Rodney, 3rd Baron Rodney

Bishop of Bangor – Christopher Bethell 
Bishop of Llandaff – Edward Copleston 
Bishop of St Asaph – William Carey 
Bishop of St Davids – John Jenkinson

Events
20 April – Opening of the Ffestiniog Railway, the first narrow-gauge railway in the world.
21 June – An Act of Parliament is passed, allowing the construction of the Taff Vale Railway.
June – Crawshay Bailey buys the Aberaman estate from the family of Anthony Bacon at auction.
9 November – John Frost is elected Mayor of Newport.
date unknown
The final known duel in Wales takes place, fought with pistols at Gumfreston Hall in Pembrokeshire, between MP Sir John Owen and former Tenby mayor William Richards. Richards is badly wounded.
Humphrey Gwalchmai launches the periodical Yr Athraw.
The Philanthropic Order of True Ivorites is established in Wrexham by Thomas Robert Jones, it is Wales' first friendly society.

Arts and literature

New books

English language
Rice Rees - An Essay on the Welsh Saints
Thomas Roscoe - Wanderings and Excursions in North Wales
Samuel Prideaux Tregelles - Passages in the Old Testament connected with the Revelation

Welsh language
Thomas Price (Carnhuanawc) - Hanes Cymru a Chenedl y Cymry o'r Cynoesoedd hyd at Farwolaeth Llywelyn ap Gruffydd, vol. 1
John Williams (Ab Ithel) - Eglwys Loegr yn Anymddibynol ar Eglwys Rhufain

Music
John David Edwards - Original Sacred Music

Births
30 January – Lewis Jones, one of the founders of the Welsh settlement in Patagonia (d. 1904)
15 March – Griffith Jones (Glan Menai), teacher and author (d. 1906)
1 April – John Owen, balladeer (d. 1915)
26 May – Sir John Dillwyn-Llewellyn, 1st Baronet, politician (d. 1927)
5 July – Evan Herber Evans, Nonconformist leader (d. 1896)
6 October – Allen Raine, novelist (d. 1908)
20 October – Daniel Owen, novelist (d. 1895)
9 November – Isaac Foulkes, newspaper proprietor (d. 1904)
9 November – Arthur Charles Humphreys-Owen, politician (d. 1905)

Deaths
11 August - William Williams (Gwilym Twrog), poet, 67
24 August Sir Christopher Cole, Royal Navy officer and politician, 66
22 November - Peter Bailey Williams, clergyman and writer, 73
27 December - Edward Jones, Maes y Plwm, hymn-writer, 75

References

Wales